Ada Mary Pritchard (January 19, 1898 – June 9, 1987) was a politician in Ontario, Canada. She was a Progressive Conservative member of the Legislative Assembly of Ontario from 1963 to 1971 who represented the ridings of Hamilton Centre and Hamilton West.

Background
Pritchard was born in England, to James Dickenson Newton and Agnes Mary McInnes. She married Charles Harry Pritchard  and they had one daughter, Kathleen. They emigrated to Canada in 1926 and settled in Hamilton, Ontario. She died in 1987.

Politics
Pritchard ran for city council in Hamilton in 1950 but failed to win a seat. She tried again the following year, this time being successful. In 1956 she was successful in gaining a seat on the executive Board of Control, a more powerful position.

In the 1963 provincial election she ran as the Progressive Conservative candidate in the riding of Hamilton Centre. She defeated NDP candidate Bill Scandlan by 672 votes. In 1967 provincial election, she ran in a newly redistributed riding of Hamilton West. She defeated Liberal candidate Vincent Agro by 1,110 votes.

In 1970, she announced her intention to retire from politics.

References

External links 
 

1898 births
1993 deaths
Hamilton, Ontario city councillors
Progressive Conservative Party of Ontario MPPs
Women MPPs in Ontario
Women municipal councillors in Canada
20th-century Canadian women politicians